Yahaan Sabki Lagi Hai is a 2015 Indian multi-lingual film written and directed by Satavisha Bose and Cyrus R. Khambhata. The film stars Varun Thakur, Eden Shyodhi, Heerok Das and Teeshay Shah in lead roles and was released in India on 27 March 2015. It is an allegory on the journey of life, especially at times when one feels victimized or shortchanged, set in the milieu of Indian-English-speaking urban youth.

Plot

The film looks at the way we casually live in a class system built on blatant economic and social disparities, the way we want to be fooled by our belief systems, the way we validate our tastes and are also very protective of them. By exploring a counter-point for every point, the film subtly questions not only our material value system but also our emotional value system.

Cast 
 Varun Thakur - Bharat
 Eden Shyodhi - Kesang
 Heerok Das - Chandu
 Teeshay Shah - Shanti

Soundtrack

The soundtrack of Yahaan Sabki Lagi Hai consists of 9 tracks composed by Pankaj Awasthi.

Critical reception

Deborah Young of The Hollywood Reporter praised the film’s acting performances and dialogues, saying, “India’s classes face off in an energetic, off-beat young road movie poised between drama and farce.”  Saibal Chatterjee of NDTV gave the film a rating of 3 out of 5 and said that, "Yahaan Sabki Lagi Hai is about people screwed up as much by the system as by their own follies, but the final impact of the film is not as gloomy as the title might suggest." Renuka Vyavahare of The Times of India praised the acting performances but criticized the film saying that, "Its abstract concept makes no impact, pseudo-intellectual execution fails to strike a chord and irrelevant scenes elongate your agony. Ordinary lives make for extraordinary tales if told commendably, which is not the case here." and gave the film a rating of 1.5 out of 5. Kusumita Das of Deccan Chronicle gave the film a rating of 1.5 out of 5 saying that, "The makers of Yahaan Sabki Lagi Hai had an idea, but perhaps didn’t know how best to go about executing it. The story has pace but falters when it comes to substance."

References

External links 
 
 

2010s Hindi-language films
2015 films
Indian drama films
2015 drama films
Hindi-language drama films